Łężyca ((German: Grünhof) is a village in the administrative district of Gmina Damnica, within Słupsk County, Pomeranian Voivodeship, in northern Poland. The village has a population of six.

References

Villages in Słupsk County